Laidlaw v. Organ, 15 U.S. (2 Wheat.) 178 (1817), is a case decided by the US Supreme Court that established caveat emptor in the United States.

Facts
Organ purchased 111 hogsheads of tobacco (111,000 pounds) from Laidlaw & Co. on February 18, 1815 in New Orleans. The purchase was made between 8 and 9am on the same day that news broke that a peace treaty had been accepted between America and Britain that ended the War of 1812 and lifted a naval embargo that had drastically depressed the price of American tobacco by 30 to 50 percent. Organ was aware of the lifting of the embargo because his brother had informed him earlier that morning. Laidlaw was not aware of the news. During the discussion of the contract, Organ was asked if he was aware of any reasons for the price to be higher; Organ stayed silent over the news of the lifting of the embargo. The subsequent rise in tobacco prices after the signing of the contract incurred a large relative loss on the sale compared to the tobacco's value the next day. Two days later, on the 20th, Laidlaw & Co. repossessed the tobacco by force from Organ, who filed suit for breach of contract to regain the tobacco or to be awarded damages.

Procedural history
The trial court charged the jury to find for the plaintiff (Organ).

Holding
Chief Justice Marshall's unanimous opinion can be interpreted to state that withholding information that is calculated to deceive the other party can cause a contract to be void on equitable grounds.  However, on the question of whether Organ had an obligation to disclose the information he had obtained about the end of the war, the opinion declares, "The court is of opinion that he was not bound to communicate it."

Marshall's opinion went on to state, "It would be difficult to circumscribe the contrary doctrine within proper limits, where the means of intelligence are equally accessible to both parties. But at the same time, each party must take care not to say or do any thing tending to impose upon the other."

The case was remanded to the District court of Louisiana, with directions to award a venire facias de novo. The court stated the question of equitable relief should have been submitted to a jury and that Laidlaw was entitled to a new trial. Chief Justice Marshall's opinion was brief, at approximately 120 words.

Significance
Laidlaw has been recognized by US legal scholars as a central case in the history of US contract law. It was the first case in which the Supreme Court adopted the rule of caveat emptor and "was one of the first cases to come before the [Supreme] Court involving a contract for future delivery of a commodity." It is also the first case to start to articulate a doctrine of forbidding active concealment.

Laidlaw has been cited by 110 different cases and maintains great importance in US legal scholarship and education (including law school contracts courses). It has also appeared over 100 times in law review articles, appellate court briefs, and other academic materials.

Laidlaw has also faced criticism from an economic perspective on the idea that nondisclosure of information that will shortly become public does not encourage overall efficiency because it merely affects distribution.  Earlier disclosure could have resulted in more efficient planting decisions by farmers, and nondisclosure served only to enrich Organ.

Trivia
Organ, the vendee, was represented by Francis Scott Key.

Quote
"[E]ach party must take care not to say or do anything tending to impose upon [i.e. take advantage of] the other"
-Marshall

See also
List of United States Supreme Court cases, volume 15

References

External links

 

1817 in United States case law
United States Supreme Court cases
United States contract case law
United States tobacco case law
United States in the War of 1812
19th century in New Orleans
United States Supreme Court cases of the Marshall Court